Allt-yr-yn is a suburb of the city of Newport, south-east Wales.

Name
Pronounced by English-speaking locals as "Olt-er-reen", the spelling should include two Ns at the end, as "Allt-yr-ynn". The name means "The slope (allt) of the ash trees (ynn which is the plural of onnen – ash tree)" in Welsh.

Description
Allt-yr-yn forms an electoral ward (district) and coterminous community (parish) of the city. It is mainly residential and contains many large houses built in the early part of the 20th century. Some of the district is built upon the Ridgeway, Newport, with some of the ward offering views of surrounding areas such as Twmbarlwm. The area is governed by the Newport City Council.

Towards the City Centre, Allt-yr-yn is home to the offices of Newport City Council, at the Civic Centre, of which its clock tower can be seen for miles around.

University of Wales, Newport had a campus located in Allt-yr-yn. It served as the university's Science, IT and Business faculty. 
before moving to a site with a new £35 million complex on the banks of the River Usk in central Newport. The new campus formally opened in January 2011. Initially the new campus will house the Newport Business School and design, film and media elements of the Newport School of Art, Media and Design.

On the west side of Allt-yr-yn heights there is a Local Nature Reserve containing ancient woodland, meadows and five ponds. Between 1934 and the mid-1960s this was home to an open-air swimming baths, and is now managed by a volunteer group known as WING – Wildlife in Newport Group. The nature reserve borders the Crumlin Arm of the Monmouthshire and Brecon Canal which runs parallel to the M4 Motorway at Allt-yr-yn. Lock 2 has been restored by volunteers and work has started on lock 3. Lock 1 disappeared under road works in Newport early in the 20th century.

A permanent military presence was established in the area with the completion of the Cavalry Barracks in 1845.

There was once a hospital in the ward, but this was deemed surplus to requirements and the site is now the Allt-yr-yn Heights estate.

References

External links

University of Wales, Newport
Newport City News 
www.geograph.co.uk : photos of Allt-yr-yn and surrounding area

Districts of Newport, Wales
Wards of Newport, Wales
Communities in Newport, Wales
Populated places established in the 20th century